Jack Chipchase (born April 5, 1945) is a Canadian former professional ice hockey player and coach who played in the World Hockey Association (WHA). He played part of the 1972–73 WHA season for the Philadelphia Blazers. He served as the head coach of the Roanoke Valley Rebels of the Southern Hockey League during the 1975–76 season.

References

External links

1945 births
Canadian ice hockey coaches
Canadian ice hockey defencemen
Greensboro Generals (EHL) players
Ice hockey people from Ontario
Living people
Memphis South Stars players
Omaha Knights (CHL) players
Philadelphia Blazers players
Philadelphia Firebirds (NAHL) players
Roanoke Valley Rebels (EHL) players
Roanoke Valley Rebels (SHL) players
Rochester Americans players
Salem Rebels (EHL) players
Toronto Marlboros players
Tulsa Oilers (1964–1984) players
Vancouver Canucks (WHL) players
Victoria Maple Leafs players
Canadian expatriate ice hockey players in the United States